Leonard James Callaghan, Baron Callaghan of Cardiff,  (27 March 191226 March 2005), commonly known as Jim Callaghan, was a British statesman and politician who served as Prime Minister of the United Kingdom from 1976 to 1979 and Leader of the Labour Party from 1976 to 1980. Callaghan is the only person to have held all four Great Offices of State, having served as Chancellor of the Exchequer from 1964 to 1967, Home Secretary from 1967 to 1970 and Foreign Secretary from 1974 to 1976. He was a Member of Parliament (MP) from 1945 to 1987.

Born into a working-class family in Portsmouth, Callaghan left school early and began his career as a tax inspector, before becoming a trade union official in the 1930s; he served as a lieutenant in the Royal Navy during the Second World War. He was elected to Parliament at the 1945 election, and was regarded as being on the left wing of the Labour Party. He was appointed to the Attlee government as a parliamentary secretary in 1947, and began to move increasingly towards the right wing of the Labour Party, while maintaining his reputation as a "Keeper of the Cloth Cap"that is, seen as maintaining close ties between Labour and the trade unions. Following Labour's defeat at the 1951 election, Callaghan increasingly became regarded as the leader of the right wing of the Labour Party, and stood for the positions of deputy leader in 1960 and for leader in 1963, but was defeated by George Brown for the former and Harold Wilson for the latter.

Following Labour's victory at the 1964 election, Wilson appointed Callaghan as Chancellor of the Exchequer; this appointment coincided with a turbulent period for the British economy, during which Callaghan had to tackle both a chronic balance of payments deficit and various speculative attacks on the pound sterling, with its exchange rate to other currencies being fixed by the Bretton Woods system. On 18 November 1967, having initially denied that it would do so, the Government devalued the pound sterling. In the wake of the decision, Wilson moved Callaghan to the role of Home Secretary. During this time, Callaghan was responsible for overseeing the operations of the British Army to support the police in Northern Ireland, following a request from the Northern Ireland government. Callaghan remained in the Shadow Cabinet during Labour's period in Opposition from 1970 to 1974; upon Labour's victory at the 1974 election, Wilson appointed Callaghan as Foreign Secretary. Callaghan was responsible for renegotiating the terms of Britain's membership of the European Communities (EC), and strongly supported the successful "Yes" vote campaign in the 1975 referendum, which confirmed the UK's membership of the EC.

When Wilson suddenly announced his retirement in March 1976, Callaghan defeated five other candidates to be elected Leader of the Labour Party; he was appointed prime minister on 5 April 1976. Despite winning a narrow majority in the House of Commons at the 1974 election, Labour had lost this by the time Callaghan became prime minister, and several by-election defeats and defections in his early months forced Callaghan to strike a confidence and supply agreement with the Liberal Party. While this initially proved stable, in the wake of significant industrial disputes and widespread strikes in the 1978–79 "Winter of Discontent", and the defeat of the referendum on devolution for Scotland, led to minor parties joining the Conservatives to pass a motion of no-confidence in Callaghan on 28 March 1979. Although remaining personally popular in opinion polls, Callaghan led Labour to defeat at the 1979 election and was replaced by Margaret Thatcher.

Callaghan initially remained as Labour leader, serving as Leader of the Opposition until November 1980. He attempted to  reform the process by which Labour elected its leader. After leaving the leadership, he returned to the backbench, and between 1983 and 1987 was Father of the House of Commons. On retiring from the Commons in 1987, he was elevated to the House of Lords as Baron Callaghan of Cardiff. He died on 26 March 2005 and remains to date the UK's longest-lived former prime minister.

Early life and career
Leonard James Callaghan was born at 38 Funtington Road, Copnor, Portsmouth, England, on 27 March 1912. He took his middle name from his father, James (1877–1921), who was the son of an Irish Catholic father who had fled to England during the Great Irish Famine and a Jewish mother. Callaghan's father ran away from home in the 1890s to join the Royal Navy; as he was a year too young to enlist, he gave a false date of birth and changed his surname from Garogher to Callaghan, so that his true identity could not be traced. He rose to the rate of Chief Petty Officer.

His mother was Charlotte Callaghan ( Cundy, 1879–1961) an English Baptist. As the Catholic Church at the time refused to marry Catholics to members of other denominations, James Callaghan senior abandoned Catholicism and married Charlotte in a Baptist chapel. Their first child was Dorothy Gertrude Callaghan (1904–82).

James Callaghan senior served in the First World War on board the battleship HMS Agincourt. After he was demobbed in 1919, he joined the Coastguard and the family moved to the town of Brixham in Devon, but he died only two years later of a heart attack in 1921 at the age of 44, leaving the family without an income, and forced to rely on charity to survive. Their financial situation was improved in 1924 when the first Labour government was elected, and introduced changes allowing Mrs Callaghan to be granted a widow's pension of ten shillings a week, on the basis that her husband's death was partly due to his war service.

In his early years, Callaghan was known by his first name Leonard. When he entered politics in 1945 he decided to be known by his middle name James, and from then on he was referred to as James or Jim. He attended Portsmouth Northern Secondary School. He gained the Senior Oxford Certificate in 1929, but could not afford entrance to university and instead sat the Civil Service entrance exam. At the age of 17, Callaghan left to work as a clerk for the Inland Revenue at Maidstone in Kent. While working as a tax inspector, Callaghan joined the Maidstone branch of the Labour Party and the Association of the Officers of Taxes (AOT), a trade union for this branch of the Civil Service; within a year of joining he became the office secretary of the union. In 1932 he passed a Civil Service exam which enabled him to become a senior tax inspector, and that same year he became the Kent branch secretary of the AOT. The following year he was elected to the AOT's national executive council. In 1934, he was transferred to Inland Revenue offices in London. Following a merger of unions in 1936, Callaghan was appointed a full-time union official and to the post of assistant secretary of the Inland Revenue Staff Federation (IRSF), and resigned from his Civil Service duties.

During his time working as a tax inspector in the early-1930s, Callaghan met his future wife Audrey Moulton, and they were married in July 1938 at Maidstone.

His union position at the IRSF brought Callaghan into contact with Harold Laski, the Chairman of the Labour Party's National Executive Committee and an academic at the London School of Economics. Laski encouraged him to stand for Parliament, although later on he requested Callaghan several times to study and lecture at the LSE.

Following the outbreak of World War II Callaghan applied to join the Royal Navy in 1940, but was initially turned down on the basis that a Trade Union official was deemed to be a reserved occupation. He was finally allowed to join the Royal Navy Volunteer Reserve as an Ordinary Seaman in 1942. While he trained for his promotion his medical examination revealed that he was suffering from tuberculosis, so he was admitted to the Royal Naval Hospital Haslar in Gosport near Portsmouth. After he recovered, he was discharged and assigned to duties with the Admiralty in Whitehall. He was assigned to the Japanese section and wrote a service manual for the Royal Navy The Enemy: Japan. He then served in the East Indies Fleet on board the escort carrier HMS Activity and was promoted to the rank of Lieutenant in April 1944.

While on leave from the Navy, Callaghan was selected as a Parliamentary candidate for Cardiff South—he narrowly won the local party ballot with twelve votes against the next highest candidate George Thomas, who received eleven. Callaghan had been encouraged to put his name forward for the Cardiff South seat by his friend Dai Kneath, a member of the IRSF National executive from Swansea, who was in turn an associate and friend of the local Labour Party secretary, Bill Headon.

After VE Day, he returned, along with other prospective candidates, to the United Kingdom to stand in the general election.

Parliament and Cabinet

The Labour Party won the overdue general election in a landslide victory on 26 July 1945, bringing Clement Attlee to power, in charge of the first-ever majority Labour government. Callaghan won his Cardiff South seat at the 1945 UK general election (and would hold a Cardiff-area seat continuously until his retirement in 1987). He defeated the sitting Conservative MP, Sir Arthur Evans, by 17,489 votes to 11,545. He campaigned on such issues as the rapid demobilisation of the armed forces and for a new housing construction programme. He stood on the left wing of the Party, and was a vocal critic of the United States in 1945, joining 22 other rebels in voting against accepting the Anglo-American loan. Callaghan did not join the Keep Left group of left-wing Labour MPs, but he did sign a letter in 1947 with 20 other MPs from the group calling for a 'socialist foreign policy' which would create an alternative to the ruthless capitalism of the United States and the totalitarian Bolshevism of the USSR.

Callaghan was soon appointed parliamentary secretary to the Ministry of Transport in 1947 where, advised by the young chief constable of Hertfordshire, Sir Arthur Young, his term saw important improvements in road safety, notably the introduction of zebra crossings, and an extension in the use of cat's eyes. He moved to be parliamentary and financial secretary to the Admiralty from 1950, where he was a delegate to the Council of Europe and resisted plans for a European army.

Callaghan was popular with Labour MPs, and was elected to the Shadow Cabinet every year while the Labour Party was in opposition from 1951 to 1964. He was now a staunch Gaitskellite on the Labour right wing. He was Parliamentary Adviser to the Police Federation from 1955 to 1960 when he negotiated an increase in police pay with then-General Secretary Arthur Charles Evans. He ran for the Deputy Leadership of the party in 1960 as an opponent of unilateral nuclear disarmament, and despite the other candidate of the Labour right (George Brown) agreeing with him on this policy, he forced Brown to a second vote. In November 1961, Callaghan became Shadow Chancellor. When Hugh Gaitskell died in January 1963, Callaghan ran to succeed him, but came third in the leadership contest, which was won by Harold Wilson. However, he did gain the support of right-wingers, such as Denis Healey and Anthony Crosland, who wanted to prevent Wilson from being elected leader but who also did not trust George Brown.

Chancellor of the Exchequer, 1964–1967
In October 1964, Conservative Prime Minister Sir Alec Douglas-Home (who had only been in power for twelve months since the resignation of Harold Macmillan) was forced to call a general election, the parliament being about to expire. Labour won a narrow majority, gaining 56 seats for a total of 317 to the Conservatives' 304. The new Labour government under Harold Wilson immediately faced economic problems; Wilson acted within his first hours to appoint Callaghan as the new chancellor of the Exchequer. The previous chancellor, Reginald Maudling, had initiated fiscally expansionary measures which had helped create a pre-election economic boom; by greatly increasing domestic demand this had caused imports to grow much faster than exports, thus when Labour entered government they faced a balance of payments deficit of £800,000,000, and an immediate sterling crisis. Both Wilson and Callaghan took a strong stance against devaluation of sterling, partly due to the perception that the devaluation carried out by the previous Labour government in 1949 had contributed to that government's downfall. The alternative to devaluation, however, was a series of austerity measures designed to reduce demand in the economy in order to reduce imports, and to stabilise the balance of payments and the value of sterling.

Just ten days after taking up his post, Callaghan immediately introduced a 15% surcharge on imports, with the exception of foodstuffs and raw materials. This measure was intended to tackle the balance of payments deficit; however, it caused an uproar amongst Britain's international trading partners. The outcry was so intense that it caused the government to announce that the surcharge was a temporary measure. Callaghan later admitted in his autobiography that he could have handled the matter better, and in his haste to tackle the balance of payments problem, had failed to consult foreign governments.

On 11 November, Callaghan gave his first budget and announced increases in income tax, petrol tax and the introduction of a new capital gains tax, actions which most economists deemed necessary to take the heat out of the balance and sterling deficit. In line with Labour's manifesto commitments, the budget also contained social measures to increase the state pension and the widows pension; measures which were disliked by the City and speculators, causing a run on the pound. On 23 November, it was decided to increase the bank rate from 2% to 7%, which generated a large amount of criticism. Handling the situation was made more difficult by the attitude of Lord Cromer, the Governor of the Bank of England, who argued against the fiscal policies of the new Labour government. When Callaghan and Wilson threatened to call a new general election, the governor soon raised a £3,000,000,000 loan to stabilise the reserves and the deficit.

His second budget came on 6 April 1965, in which he announced efforts to deflate the economy and reduce home import demand by £250,000,000. Shortly afterwards, the bank rate was reduced from 7% down to 6%. For a brief time, the economy and British financial market stabilised, allowing in June for Callaghan to visit the United States and to discuss the state of the British economy with President Lyndon B. Johnson and the International Monetary Fund (IMF).

In July, the pound came under extreme pressure and Callaghan was forced to create harsh temporary measures to demonstrate control of the economy. These include delaying all current government building projects and postponing new pension plans. The alternative was to allow the pound to float or to devalue it. Callaghan and Wilson, however, were again adamant that a devaluation of the pound would create new social and economic problems and continued to take a firm stance against it. The government continued to struggle both with the economy and with the slender majority which, by 1966, had been reduced to one. On 28 February, Harold Wilson formally announced an election for 31 March 1966. On 1 March, Callaghan gave a 'little budget' to the Commons and announced the historic decision that the UK would adopt decimal currency. (It was actually not until 1971, under a Conservative government, that the United Kingdom moved from the system of pounds, shillings and pence to a decimal system of 100 pence to the pound.) He also announced a short-term mortgage scheme which allowed low-wage earners to maintain mortgage schemes in the face of economic difficulties. Soon afterwards, at the 1966 general election, Labour won 363 seats compared to 252 seats against the Conservatives, giving the Labour government an increased majority of 97 seats.

Callaghan introduced his next Budget on 4 May. He had informed the house that he would bring a full Budget to the House when he made his 'little budget' speech prior to the election. The main point of his budget was the introduction of a Selective Employment Tax, penalising the service industry and favouring the manufacturing industry. Twelve days after the budget, the National Union of Seamen called a national strike and the problems facing Sterling were multiplied. Additional strikes caused the balance of payments deficit to increase. However, a £3,300,000,000 loan from Swiss banks was due by the end of the year. On 14 July, the bank rate was increased again to seven percent, and on 20 July Callaghan announced a ten-point emergency package to deal with the crisis which included further tax rises and a six-month freeze on wage increases. By early 1967, the economy had begun to stabilise once again with the balance of payments moving into equilibrium, the bank rate was reduced to 6% in March and 5.5% in May.

It was under these conditions that Callaghan beat Michael Foot in a vote to become Treasurer of the Labour Party.

The economy was soon in turmoil again by June, with the Six-Day War in the Middle East. Several Arab countries, such as Kuwait and Iraq, announced an oil embargo against Britain, accusing it of intervening on the Israeli side in the conflict, resulting in a rise in oil prices which had a disastrous effect on the balance of payments. Furthermore, the economy was hit in mid-September when a national dock strike lasted for eight weeks. The final straw, however, was an EEC report which suggested that the pound could not be sustained as a reserve currency and it was suggested again that the pound should be devalued. Callaghan responded by pointing out that, had it not been for the Middle East crisis, Britain would have been heading for a balance of payments surplus in 1967. However, rumours that devaluation was on the cards led to heavy selling of Sterling on world markets. Wilson and Callaghan refused a contingency fund offered from the IMF because of several conditions attached which they believed would allow the IMF to interfere with economic policy. On Wednesday 15 November, the historic decision was taken to commit the government to a 14.3% devaluation from the existing fixed exchange rate of $2.80 to the pound, to $2.40 to the pound. They intended to announce the decision publicly on the 18th. However, in the run up to the public announcement, Callaghan found himself in a tricky situation when answering questions in the House of Commons: One backbencher Robert Sheldon tabled a motion concerning a rumour that Britain would be receiving a loan from banks. Callaghan did not wish to lie to the Commons, but at the same time going public about the devaluation decision before the 18th would be financially disastrous for the country. He answered the initial question by stating that he did not comment on rumours. However a follow up question was made by Stan Orme suggesting that devaluation was preferable to deflation, which caused a major problem. Callaghan replied that he had "nothing to add or subtract from, anything I have said on previous occasions on the subject of devaluation"... Speculators seized on the fact that he had not denied there would be a devaluation and started selling Sterling. Over the next 24 hours, the flight from Sterling cost the country £1,500 million. The situation was a great political controversy at the time. As Denis Healey in his autobiography notes:

Before the devaluation, Jim Callaghan had announced publicly to the Press and the House of Commons that he would not devalue, something he later said was necessary to maintain confidence in the pound and avoid creating jitters in the financial markets. Callaghan immediately offered his resignation as chancellor, and increasing political opposition forced Wilson to accept it. Wilson then moved Roy Jenkins, the home secretary, to be chancellor; Callaghan became the new home secretary on 30 November 1967.

Home secretary, 1967–1970

Callaghan's tenure as home secretary was marked by the emerging conflict in Northern Ireland and it was as home secretary that he took the decision to deploy British Army troops in the province after a request from the Ulster Unionist Government of Northern Ireland.

Callaghan was also responsible for the Commonwealth Immigrants Act 1968, a controversial piece of legislation prompted by Conservative assertions that an influx of Kenyan Asians would soon inundate the country. It passed through the Commons in a week and placed entry controls on holders of British passports who had "no substantial connection" with Britain by setting up a new system. In his memoirs Time and Chance, Callaghan wrote that introducing the Commonwealth Immigrants Bill had been an unwelcome task but that he did not regret it. He said the Asians had "discovered a loophole" and he told a BBC interviewer: "Public opinion in this country was extremely agitated, and the consideration that was in my mind was how we could preserve a proper sense of order in this country and, at the same time, do justice to these people—I had to balance both considerations". An opponent of the Act, Conservative MP Ian Gilmour, said that it was "brought in to keep the blacks out. If it had been the case that it was 5,000 white settlers who were coming in, the newspapers and politicians, Callaghan included, who were making all the fuss would have been quite pleased".

Also significant was the passing of the Race Relations Act in the same year, making it illegal to refuse employment, housing or education on the basis of ethnic background. The Act extended the powers of the Race Relations Board at the time, to deal with complaints of discrimination and unfair attitudes. It also set up a new supervisory body, the Community Relations Commission, to promote "harmonious community relations". Presenting the Bill to Parliament, Callaghan said: "The House has rarely faced an issue of greater social significance for our country and our children."

In 1969, Callaghan, a strong supporter of the Labour–Trade Union link, led the successful opposition in a divided cabinet to Barbara Castle's White Paper "In Place of Strife" which sought to modify trade union law. Amongst its numerous proposals were plans to force unions to call a ballot before a strike was held and the establishment of an Industrial Board to enforce settlements in industrial disputes. If the proposals had become law, many of the activities of the trades unions during the Winter of Discontent a decade later would have been illegal.

Following Wilson's unexpected defeat by Edward Heath at the 1970 general election, Callaghan declined to challenge him for the leadership, despite Wilson's vulnerability. This did much to rehabilitate him in Wilson's eyes. He was in charge of drawing up a new policy statement in 1972 which contained the idea of the Social Contract between the government and trade unions. He also did much to ensure that Labour opposed the Heath government's bid to enter the Common Market—forcing Wilson's hand by making his personal opposition clear without consulting the party leader.

Foreign secretary, 1974–1976

When Wilson won the next general election and returned as prime minister in March 1974, he appointed Callaghan as Foreign Secretary which gave him responsibility for renegotiating the terms of the United Kingdom's membership of the Common Market. When the talks concluded, Callaghan led the Cabinet in declaring the new terms acceptable and he supported a "Yes" vote in the 1975 referendum. He was awarded the Freedom of the City of Cardiff on 16 March 1975.

1976 leadership election
Barely two years after beginning his second spell as prime minister, Wilson announced his surprise resignation on 16 March 1976, and unofficially endorsed Callaghan as his successor. Callaghan was the favourite to win the leadership election; although he was the oldest candidate, he was also the most experienced and least divisive. Popularity with all parts of the Labour movement saw him through the ballot of Labour MPs to win the leadership vote. On 5 April 1976, at the age of 64 years and 9 days, Callaghan became prime minister—the oldest prime minister at time of appointment since Winston Churchill.

Prime Minister of the United Kingdom: 1976–1979

Callaghan was the only prime minister to have held all three leading Cabinet positions—chancellor of the exchequer, home secretary and foreign secretary—prior to becoming prime minister.

During his first year in office, Callaghan started what has since become known as 'The Great Debate', when he spoke at Ruskin College, Oxford, about the 'legitimate concerns' of the public about the quality of education in the nation's maintained schools. This discussion led to greater involvement of the government, through its ministries, in the curriculum and administration of state education, leading to the eventual introduction of the National curriculum some ten years later. Early in his premiership he caused controversy with the appointment of Peter Jay, his then son-in-law as the British Ambassador to the United States.

Callaghan's time as prime minister was dominated by the troubles in running a government with a minority in the House of Commons: he was forced to make deals with minor parties to survive—including the Lib–Lab pact, and he had been forced to accept a referendum on devolution in Scotland as well as one in Wales (the former went in favour but did not reach the required majority, and the latter went heavily against). He also became prime minister at a time when Britain was suffering from double-digit percentage inflation and rising unemployment. He responded to the economic crises by adopting deflationary policies to reduce inflation, and cutting public expenditure—a precursor to the monetarist economic policies that the next government, a Conservative one led by Margaret Thatcher, would pursue to ease the crises.

Despite the economic difficulties faced by the government, over the summer of 1978 (shortly after the end of the Lib–Lab pact) most opinion polls showed Labour ahead, and the expectation grew that Callaghan would call an autumn election that would have given him a second term in office until autumn 1983. The economy had also started to show signs of recovery by this time. 1978 was a year of economic recovery for Britain, with inflation falling to single digits, unemployment declining during the year, and general living standards going up by more than 8%. Famously, he strung along the opposition and was expected to make his declaration of election in a broadcast on 7 September 1978. His decision to put off the election was seen by many at the time as a sign of his domination of the political scene and he ridiculed his opponents by singing old-time music hall star Vesta Victoria's song "Waiting at the Church" at that month's Trades Union Congress meeting. This was celebrated at the time but has since been interpreted as one of the greatest moments of hubris in modern British politics. Callaghan intended to convey the message that he had not promised an election, but many at the conference misinterpreted it. The next day (6 September 1978), the conference voted to set up an election fund, and The Times reported that the cabinet meeting scheduled for 7 September 1978 would see an announcement of a general election on 5 October 1978.

Winter of Discontent

Callaghan's method of dealing with the long-term economic difficulties involved pay restraint which had been operating for four years with reasonable success. He gambled that a fifth year would further improve the economy and allow him to be re-elected in 1979, and so attempted to hold pay rises to 5% or less. The trade unions rejected continued pay restraint and in a succession of strikes over the winter of 1978–79 (known as the Winter of Discontent) secured higher pay. The industrial unrest made his government unpopular, and Callaghan's response to one interview question only made it worse. Returning to the United Kingdom from a summit held in Guadeloupe in January 1979, Callaghan was asked, "What is your general approach, in view of the mounting chaos in the country at the moment?" Callaghan replied, "Well, that's a judgement that you are making. I promise you that if you look at it from outside, and perhaps you're taking rather a parochial view at the moment, I don't think that other people in the world would share the view that there is mounting chaos." This reply was reported in The Sun under the headline "Crisis? What Crisis?". Callaghan also later admitted in regard to the Winter of Discontent that he had "let the country down".

The Winter of Discontent saw Labour's performance in the opinion polls slump dramatically. They had topped most of the pre-winter opinion polls by several points, but in February 1979 at least one opinion poll was showing the Conservatives 20 points ahead of Labour and it appeared inevitable that Labour would lose the forthcoming election.

In the buildup to the election, the Daily Mirror and The Guardian supported Labour, while The Sun, the Daily Mail, the Daily Express, and The Daily Telegraph supported the Conservatives.

On 28 March 1979, the House of Commons passed a motion of no-confidence by one vote, 311–310, which forced Callaghan to call a general election that was held on 3 May. The Conservatives under Margaret Thatcher ran a campaign on the slogan "Labour Isn't Working" and won the election. Callaghan agreed to a proposal by Brian Walden, a former Labour MP who was by then a broadcaster, to take part in two televised debates with Margaret Thatcher to be produced by LWT with the intention that they would be broadcast on ITV on 22 and 29 April 1979. At the insistence of the Liberal Party, their leader David Steel was also invited to take participate in the proposed debates, and he also quickly accepted the offer. However Mrs Thatcher ultimately rejected the approach to take part in the debates, citing among other reasons her belief that the election was for a government, not a president. Her refusal meant that the debates did not go ahead.

Callaghan's failure to call an election during 1978 was widely seen as a political miscalculation; indeed, he himself later admitted that not calling an election was an error of judgement. However, private polling by the Labour Party in the autumn of 1978 had shown the two main parties with about the same level of support. After losing power in 1979, Labour spent the next 18 years in opposition.

Resignation, backbenches and retirement
Notwithstanding electoral defeat, Callaghan stayed on as Labour leader until 15 October 1980, shortly after the party conference had voted for a new system of election by electoral college involving the individual members and trade unions. His resignation ensured that his successor would be elected by MPs only. Following a campaign that laid bare the deep internal divisions of the parliamentary Labour Party, Michael Foot narrowly defeated Denis Healey on 10 November in the second round of the election to succeed Callaghan as party leader. Foot had been a relatively late entrant to the contest and his decision to stand ended the chances of Peter Shore.

In 1982, along with his friend Gerald Ford, he co-founded the annual AEI World Forum.

In 1983, he attacked Labour's plans to reduce defence, and the same year became Father of the House as the longest continually-serving member of the Commons.

In 1987, he was made a Knight of the Garter and stood down at the 1987 general election after 42 years as an MP. He was one of the last remaining MPs elected in the Labour landslide of 1945. Shortly afterwards, he was elevated to the House of Lords on 5 November 1987 as a life peer with the title Baron Callaghan of Cardiff, of the City of Cardiff in the County of South Glamorgan. In 1987, his autobiography, Time and Chance, was published. He also served as a non-executive director of the Bank of Wales.

His wife Audrey, a former chairman (1969–82) of Great Ormond Street Hospital, spotted a letter to a newspaper which pointed out that the copyright of Peter Pan, which had been assigned by J. M. Barrie to the hospital, was going to expire at the end of that year, 1987 (50 years after Barrie's death, the then-current copyright term). In 1988, Callaghan moved an amendment to the Copyright Designs & Patents Act, then under consideration in the House of Lords, to grant the hospital a right to royalty in perpetuity despite the lapse of copyright, and it was passed by the government.

Tony Benn recorded in his diary entry of 3 April 1997 that during the 1997 general election campaign, Callaghan was telephoned by a volunteer at Labour headquarters asking him if he would be willing to become more active in the party. According to Benn:One young woman in her mid-twenties rang up Jim Callaghan and said to him on the phone, "Have you ever thought of being a bit more active in politics?" So Callaghan said, "Well I was a Labour Prime Minister – what more could I do?"

During an interview broadcast on the BBC Radio 4 programme The Human Button, Callaghan became the only prime minister to go on record with his opinion on ordering a retaliation in the event of a nuclear attack on the United Kingdom:"If it were to become necessary or vital, it would have meant the deterrent had failed, because the value of the nuclear weapon is frankly only as a deterrent", he said. "But if we had got to that point, where it was, I felt, necessary to do it, then I would have done it. I've had terrible doubts, of course, about this. I say to you, if I had lived after having pressed that button, I could never, ever have forgiven myself."

In October 1999, Callaghan told The Oldie Magazine that he would not be surprised to be considered as Britain's worst prime minister in 200 years. He also said in this interview that he "must carry the can" for the Winter of Discontent.

Personal life
Callaghan's interests included rugby (he played lock for Streatham RFC before the Second World War), tennis and agriculture. He married Audrey Elizabeth Moulton, whom he had met when they both worked as Sunday School teachers at the local Baptist church, in July 1938 and had three children—one son and two daughters.
 Margaret, Baroness Jay of Paddington, who married first Peter Jay and later Professor Mike Adler.
 Julia, who married Ian Hamilton Hubbard and settled in Lancashire
 Michael, who married Jennifer Morris and settled in Essex.

Although there is much doubt about how much belief Callaghan retained into adult life, the Baptist nonconformist ethic was a profound influence throughout all of his public and private life. It is claimed that Callaghan was an atheist, who lost his belief in God while he was working as a trade union official. His son Michael Callaghan disagrees: "My father, Jim Callaghan, was brought up as a practising Baptist and as a young man was a Sunday school teacher. As a young man embracing socialism he had difficulties reconciling his new beliefs with the teachings of his church, but he was persuaded to stay in his Baptist chapel. ... Incidentally, the title of his autobiography is 'Time and Chance', a quote from Ecclesiastes 9: 11."

One of his final public appearances came on 29 April 2002, when shortly after his 90th birthday, he sat alongside the then-Prime Minister Tony Blair and three other surviving former prime ministers at the time – Edward Heath, Margaret Thatcher and John Major at Buckingham Palace for a dinner which formed part of the celebrations for the Golden Jubilee of Elizabeth II, alongside his daughter Margaret, Baroness Jay, who had served as leader of the House of Lords from 1998 until 2001.

Death

Callaghan died on 26 March 2005 at his home in Ringmer, East Sussex, of lobar pneumonia, cardiac failure and kidney failure, the day before his 93rd birthday. He died just 11 days after his wife of 67 years, who had spent the last four years of her life in a nursing home due to Alzheimer's disease. He died as Britain's longest-lived former prime minister, having surpassed Harold Macmillan's record 39 days earlier. Callaghan died 4 months before former Prime Minister Edward Heath.

Lord Callaghan was cremated, and his ashes were scattered in a flowerbed around the base of the Peter Pan statue near the entrance of London's Great Ormond Street Hospital, where his wife had formerly been chair of the board of governors.

His Order of the Garter Banner was transferred from St George's Chapel, Windsor Castle to Llandaff Cathedral in Cardiff following his death.

Historiography
His contribution and legacy are still contested. The left-wing of the Labour Party considers him a traitor whose betrayals of true socialism laid the foundations for Thatcherism. They point to his decision in 1976 to allow the IMF to control the government budget. They accuse him of abandoning the traditional Labour commitment to full employment. They blame his rigorous pursuit of a policy of controlling income growth for the Winter of Discontent. Writers on the right of the Labour Party complained that he was a weak leader who was unable to stand up to the left. The New Labour writers who admire Tony Blair identify him with the old-style partisanship that was a dead end which a new generation of modernisers had to repudiate.

Practically all commentators agree that Callaghan made a serious mistake by not calling an election in the autumn of 1978. Bernard Donoughue, a senior official in his government, depicts Callaghan as a strong and efficient administrator who stood heads above his predecessor Harold Wilson. The standard scholarly biography by Kenneth O. Morgan is generally favourable—at least for the middle of his premiership—while admitting failures at the beginning, at the end and in his leadership role following Margaret Thatcher's victory. The treatment found in most textbooks and surveys of the period remains largely negative.

Historians Alan Sked and Chris Cook have summarised the general consensus of historians regarding Labour in power in the 1970s:

Arms

See also

 1976 sterling crisis
 Shadow Cabinet of James Callaghan

References

Bibliography

Further reading

Books by Callaghan 
 Callaghan, James. Time and Chance. Collins, 1987.
 Callaghan, James. Challenges and Opportunities for British Foreign Policy . Fabian Society, 1975.

Biographies and studies 
 Ashton, Nigel. "‘A Local Terrorist Made Good’: the Callaghan government and the Arab–Israeli peace process, 1977–79". Contemporary British History 31.1 (2017): 114–135 online .
 Bell, Patrick. The Labour Party in Opposition 1970–1974 (Routledge, 2012).
 Byrne, Christopher, Nick Randall, and Kevin Theakston. "The Collapse of Keynesian Welfarism 1970–1979: Heath, Wilson, Callaghan." in Disjunctive Prime Ministerial Leadership in British Politics (Palgrave Pivot, Cham, 2020). 51–83.
 Childs, David. Britain since 1945: A Political History (7th edn 2012), pp. 190–212.
 Conroy, Harry. James Callaghan (Haus, 2006).
 Dell, Edmund. The Chancellors: A History of the Chancellors of the Exchequer, 1945–90 (HarperCollins, 1997), pp. 304–46, covers his term as Chancellor.
 Denver, David, and Mark Garnett. British General Elections Since 1964: Diversity, Dealignment, and Disillusion (2014) 
 Derbyshire, Dennis. Politics in Britain: From Callaghan to Thatcher (Political Spotlights). (Chambers, 1990).
 Deveney, Paul J. Callaghan's Journey to Downing Street (2010), scholarly study to 1976. excerpt 
 Donoughue, Bernard. Prime Minister: Conduct of Policy Under Harold Wilson and James Callaghan, 1974–79 (Jonathan Cape, 1987).
 Dorey, Peter. "‘Should I stay or should I go?’: James Callaghan's decision not to call an autumn 1978 general election". British Politics (2016) 11#1 pp 95–118. abstract 
 Dorey, Peter. A Rather Novel Constitutional Experiment': The Formation of the 1977–8 'Lib–Lab Pact. Parliamentary History 30#3 (2011): 374–394.
 Donoughue, Bernard. The Heat of the Kitchen (Politico's Publishing, 2003).
 Hay, Colin. "The winter of discontent thirty years on." The Political Quarterly 80.4 (2009): 545–552.
 Hennessy, Peter. The Prime Minister: the office and its holders since 1945 (Palgrave Macmillan, 2001), pp. 376–96.
 Hickson, Kevin, and Jasper Miles, eds. James Callaghan: An Underrated Prime Minister? (Biteback, 2020) excerpt 
 Hickson, Kevin, and Anthony Seldon, eds. New Labour, Old Labour: The Wilson and Callaghan Governments 1974–1979 (Routledge, 2004).
 Holmes, Martin. The Labour government, 1974–79: political aims and economic reality (Macmillan, 1985).
 Hughes, R. Gerald, et al. "Labour's Defence and Foreign Policy, 1976-79." in James Callaghan: An Underrated Prime Minister? (Biteback, 2020) pp. 235–258.
 Jefferys, Kevin (ed). Leading Labour (I. B. Tauris, 1999).
 Jones, Tudor. Remaking the Labour Party: From Gaitskell to Blair (Routledge, 2005).
 Kirkup, Jonathan, ed. The Lib-Lab Pact: A Parliamentary Agreement, 1977–78 (2014) excerpt
 Marsh, Steve. "Wilson, Callaghan and the management of Anglo-American relations, 1974-1976." Contemporary British History (2020): 1–26. https://doi.org/10.1080/13619462.2020.1785292 
 Meredith, Stephen. "The oratory of James Callaghan." in Labour orators from Bevan to Miliband (Manchester University Press, 2016) online .
 Meredith, Stephen. Labours old and new: the parliamentary right of the British Labour Party 1970–79 and the roots of New Labour (Oxford University Press, 2008).
 Morgan, Kenneth O. Callaghan: A Life (Oxford University Press, 1997). excerpt 
 Morgan, Kenneth O. Britain since 1945: The People's Peace (2nd edn 2001), pp. 397–433.
 Pryce, Sue. "James Callaghan 1976–9: A Caretaker." in Sue Pryce, Presidentializing the Premiership (Palgrave Macmillan, 1997), pp. 147–162.
 Rodgers, William. "Government under Stress. Britain'S Winter of Discontent 1979". The Political Quarterly 55#2 (1984): 171–179.
 Rogers, Chris. "Economic policy and the problem of sterling under Harold Wilson and James Callaghan." Contemporary British History 25#3 (2011): 339–363.
 Rosen, Greg. Dictionary of Labour Biography (Politico's Publishing, 2001).
 Rosen, Greg. Old Labour to New (Politico's Publishing, 2005).
 Shepherd, John.  Crisis? what crisis? : the Callaghan government and the British winter of discontent (Manchester University Press, 2013).
 Sked, Alan and Chris Cook. Post-War Britain: A Political History (4th edn 1993), pp. 312–28.
 Thomas, James. "‘Bound in by history’: The Winter of Discontent in British politics, 1979–2004." Media, Culture & Society 29#2 (2007): 263–283.
 Turner, Alwyn. Crisis? What Crisis?: Britain in the 1970s (2013), pp. 181–204.
 Wass, Douglas. Decline to Fall: The Making of British Macro-economic Policy and the 1976 IMF Crisis (2008)

Memoirs 
 Healey, Denis. The Time of My Life. Michael Joseph, 1989.

External links

 More about James Callaghan on the Downing Street website.
 
 An interview with Chancellor Callaghan after an IMF interview at Rio, Brazil
 Official portrait of James Callaghan by David Griffiths 
 'Prime Ministers in the Post-War World: James Callaghan', lecture by Kenneth O. Morgan at Gresham College on 5 June 2007 (with video and audio files available for download)
 
 
Bronze bust of James Callaghan in the UK Parliamentary Collection

|-

|-

|-

|-

|-

|-

|-

|-

|-

|-

|-

|-

|-

|-

|-

|-

|-

|-

|-

|-

|-

 
1912 births
2005 deaths
20th-century prime ministers of the United Kingdom
British Secretaries of State for Foreign and Commonwealth Affairs
Chairs of the Labour Party (UK)
Chancellors of the Exchequer of the United Kingdom
Civil servants in the Board of Inland Revenue
English economists
English people of Irish descent
English people of Jewish descent
English socialists
English trade unionists
English rugby union players
Former Baptists
Knights of the Garter
Labour Party (UK) life peers
Labour Party prime ministers of the United Kingdom
Leaders of the Labour Party (UK)
Leaders of the Opposition (United Kingdom)
Lords of the Admiralty
Members of the Fabian Society
Members of the Parliament of the United Kingdom for Cardiff constituencies
Members of the Privy Council of the United Kingdom
Ministers in the Attlee governments, 1945–1951
Ministers in the Wilson governments, 1964–1970
People of the Cold War
Politicians awarded knighthoods
Life peers created by Elizabeth II
Politicians from Portsmouth
Presidents of the European Council
Prime Ministers of the United Kingdom
Royal Naval Volunteer Reserve personnel of World War II
Royal Navy officers of World War II
Secretaries of State for the Home Department
UK MPs 1945–1950
UK MPs 1950–1951
UK MPs 1951–1955
UK MPs 1955–1959
UK MPs 1959–1964
UK MPs 1964–1966
UK MPs 1966–1970
UK MPs 1970–1974
UK MPs 1974
UK MPs 1974–1979
UK MPs 1979–1983
UK MPs 1983–1987
Welsh Labour Party MPs
Military personnel from Portsmouth
Royal Navy sailors
Shadow Chancellors of the Exchequer